Carlos is an unincorporated community in Washington Township, Randolph County, in the U.S. state of Indiana.

History
A post office called Carlos City was established in 1882, the name was changed to Carlos in 1895, and the post office closed in 1976.

Geography

References

Unincorporated communities in Randolph County, Indiana
Unincorporated communities in Indiana